Testudinella is a genus of rotifers belonging to the family Testudinellidae.

The genus has cosmopolitan distribution.

Species:
 Testudinella ahlstromi Hauer, 1956 
 Testudinella amphora Hauer, 1938

References

Flosculariaceae